Vengeance is a heavy metal band from the Netherlands formed in 1983. Arjen Anthony Lucassen, the head of Ayreon and other progressive metal projects, played in the band from its formation until 1992 when the band split up, after which he left to pursue a solo career. They later reformed on 1997.

Their guitarist, Jan Somers, who was born on 28 December 1964, died on 28 January 2011 in Mierlo, Netherlands, from a heart attack.  He was 46 years old.

Members

Current members
Leon Goewie – lead vocals
Timo Somers – guitar, backing vocals
Emile Marcelis – bass guitar
John Emmen – drums

Former members
Ian Parry – lead vocals
Arjen Anthony Lucassen - guitar
Oscar Holleman – guitar
Peer Verschuren - guitar
Peter Bourbon - guitar
Len Ruygrock - guitar
Jan Somers - guitar
Jan Bijlsma – bass guitar
Barend Courbois - bass guitar
Roland Bakker - keyboards
Paul Thissen – drums
Matt Olieschlager - drums
John Snels - drums
Hans in 't Zandt - drums
Erik Stout - drums

Timeline

Discography

Studio albums
Vengeance (1984)
We Have Ways to Make You Rock (1986)
Take It or Leave It (1987)
Arabia (1989)
The Last of the Fallen Heroes (1994)
Back from Flight 19 (1997)
Back in the Ring (2006)
Soul Collector (2009)
Crystal Eye (2012)
Piece of Cake (2013)

Live albums
Same/Same... But Different (2007)

Compilation albums
The Last Teardrop '84-'92 (1992)
Rock'n Roll Shower '84-'98 (1998)
Wings of an Arrow (2000)

Extended plays
 Only the Wind (1986)
 Rock N Roll Shower (1987)
 If Lovin' You is Wrong (1989)

Singles
"Prisoners of the Night" (1984)
"You Took Me By Surprise" (1985)
"May Heaven Strike Me Down" (1986)
"Only the Wind" / "Deathride to Glory" (1986)
"Rock 'n' Roll Shower" / "Code of Honour" (1987)
"Looks like a Winner" (1987)
"Ain't Gonna Take You Home" (1987)
"Arabia" (1989)
"As the Last Teardrop Falls" (1992)
"Planet Zilch" (1997)
"Crazy Horses" (1998)

References

Vengeance at Maximummetal.com

External links

Musical groups established in 1983
Dutch heavy metal musical groups
Arjen Anthony Lucassen